The 2005 King's Cup finals were held from 24 to 30 December 2005, the final being held at the Surakul Stadium in Phuket. Group phase games were also held in Krabi Stadium, Krabi and Phang Nga Stadium, Phang Nga. The King's Cup (คิงส์คัพ) is an annual football tournament; the first tournament was played in 1968. 

Latvia won the tournament defeating North Korea 2–1 in the final. Hosts Thailand and Oman were the other teams to play in this tournament.

Matches

Round robin tournament

Final

Winner

References

External links
RSSSF

King's Cup
Kings Cup, 2005